Swanton is a village in the town of Swanton in Franklin County, Vermont, United States. It is sometimes called Swanton Village to distinguish it from the surrounding town of the same name. The population was 2,328 at the 2020 census. It was founded in 1888.

Geography
Swanton village is located in the north-central part of the town of Swanton, along the Missisquoi River. U.S. Route 7 passes through the village as Grand Avenue, Canada Street, and Spring Street. To the north US 7 leads  to its northern terminus at Interstate 89 just south of the Canada–United States border, and to the south it leads  to St. Albans, the Franklin County seat. Interstate 89 passes just east of Swanton village, with access from Exit 21 (Vermont Route 78). I-89 leads north to the Canada–US border and south  to the Burlington area. Vermont Route 78 passes through the village on First Street, Grand Avenue, Depot Street, and North River Street, leading east  to Highgate Center and west  to Alburgh on Grand Isle in Lake Champlain. Vermont Route 36 leads west from Swanton village as Lake Street  to the shore of Lake Champlain at Maquam Bay, then south along the lakeshore  to St. Albans Bay.

Demographics

As of the census of 2000, there were 2,548 people, 1,031 households, and 680 families residing in the village.  The population density was 3,358.3 people per square mile (1,294.5/km2).  There were 1,064 housing units at an average density of 1,402.4/sq mi (540.5/km2).  The racial makeup of the village was 91.25% White, 0.35% Black or African American, 4.32% Native American, 0.98% Asian, 0.27% from other races, and 2.83% from two or more races. Hispanic or Latino of any race were 0.55% of the population.

There were 1,031 households, out of which 31.0% had children under the age of 18 living with them, 50.5% were married couples living together, 11.7% had a female householder with no husband present, and 34.0% were non-families. 26.6% of all households were made up of individuals, and 13.9% had someone living alone who was 65 years of age or older.  The average household size was 2.46 and the average family size was 2.96.

In the village, the population was spread out, with 24.8% under the age of 18, 7.3% from 18 to 24, 29.4% from 25 to 44, 22.0% from 45 to 64, and 16.5% who were 65 years of age or older.  The median age was 38 years. For every 100 females, there were 90.0 males.  For every 100 females age 18 and over, there were 85.3 males.

The median income for a household in the village was $34,153, and the median income for a family was $41,929. Males had a median income of $31,875 versus $24,800 for females. The per capita income for the village was $17,720.  About 8.5% of families and 9.7% of the population were below the poverty line, including 12.6% of those under age 18 and 7.8% of those age 65 or over.

Government
The village of Swanton is governed by a board of trustees elected by village residents to staggered terms of three years each.  The village president is the presiding officer of all village meetings of the board of trustees and is elected by village residents to a one-year term.  The village clerk/treasurer is also elected to a one-year term.

Village officers

Village President: Neal Speer (term expires 2011)
Village Trustee: Armand Messier (term expires 2013)
Village Trustee: Suzanne Washburn (term expires 2011)
Village Trustee: Chris Leach (term expires 2012)
Village Clerk & Treasurer Dianne Day (term expires 2011)

Notable people 

 Lou Blonger, confidence man; born in Swanton
 William Brayton, Justice of the Vermont Supreme Court
 Stephen F. Brown, Union Army officer in the American Civil War.
 Donald Collins, member of the Vermont State Senate.
 James Fisk, Representative from Vermont's 3rd congressional district, United States Senator
 Jerome O'Neill, U.S. Attorney for Vermont
 Brian K. Savage, Assistant Minority Leader of the Vermont House of Representatives.
 Albert M. Skeels, Wisconsin State Assemblyman, born in Swanton.

References

External links
Swanton Village official website

Incorporated villages in Vermont
 
Burlington, Vermont metropolitan area
Villages in Franklin County, Vermont